The 1990s may refer to:

 1990s, the decade
 List of decades, decades comprising years 90–99 of other centuries
 1990s (band), Scottish Indie Rock band
 "Nineties" (song), the song by Busted
 The 90's (TV series), the an American documentary series for PBS
 Nineties (TV series), the Czech television series
 The Nineties (miniseries), the CNN documentary
 The Nineties (book), the book by Chuck Klosterman